Peter Stanley is a prominent Australian military historian, who specialises in the military-social experience of war in the late nineteenth and first half of the twentieth centuries. In a career spanning over three decades, Stanley has worked as an Historian and later Head of the Military History Section at the Australian War Memorial (1980–2007), Head of the Centre for Historical Research at the National Museum of Australia (2007–13) and, since 2013, as Research Professor at the University of New South Wales in the Australian Centre for the Study of Armed Conflict and Society. Starting in 1977—and as at 2019—Stanley has written (or co-written) 27 books and edited eight others, published two novels and co-authored a booklet, and composed at least 46 chapters in books and anthologies, 59 journal articles, seven encyclopaedia entries and numerous papers. In 2011, his book Bad Characters: Sex, Crime, Mutiny, Murder and the Australian Imperial Force (2010) was the joint winner of the Prime Minister's Prize for Australian History.

Books

Novels

Booklets

Edited books

Articles and chapters

Book chapters

Chapters in anthologies

Journal articles

Conference proceedings

Encyclopaedia entries

Popular history articles

References

Bibliographies of Australian writers
Bibliographies of history